The DejaVu fonts are a superfamily of fonts designed for broad coverage of the Unicode Universal Character Set. The fonts are derived from Bitstream Vera (sans-serif) and Bitstream Charter (serif), two fonts released by Bitstream under a free license that allowed derivative works based upon them; the Vera and Charter families were limited mainly to the characters in the Basic Latin and Latin-1 Supplement portions of Unicode, roughly equivalent to ISO/IEC 8859-15, and Bitstream's licensing terms allowed the fonts to be expanded upon without explicit authorization. The DejaVu fonts project was started with the aim to "provide a wider range of characters ... while maintaining the original look and feel through the process of collaborative development". The development of the fonts is done by many contributors and is organized through a wiki and a mailing list.

The DejaVu fonts project was started by Štěpán Roh. Over time, it has absorbed several other projects that also existed to extend the Bitstream Vera typefaces; these projects include the Olwen Font Family, Bepa, Arev Fonts (only partially), and the SUSE Linux standard fonts. The full project incorporates the Bitstream Vera license, an extended MIT License, which restricts naming of modified distributions and prohibits individual sale of the typefaces, although they may be embedded within a larger commercial software package (terms also found in the later Open Font License); to the extent that the DejaVu fonts' changes can be separated from the original Bitstream Vera and Charter fonts, these changes have been deeded to the public domain.

Usage 
DejaVu fonts can be obtained from the DejaVu project repo on GitHub. Some operating systems (OpenBSD, Solaris, Haiku, AmigaOS 4, Linux distributions such as Ubuntu, Debian, Fedora, and RHEL) include DejaVu fonts in their default installation, sometimes even using them as their system fonts. These fonts were also included in the proprietary BlackBerry OS since its version 4.5, under the names "BBAlphaSans" and "BBAlphaSerif", until they were replaced in BlackBerry 10 with Slate.

DejaVu Serif Bold was used by designer Jonathan Barnbrook in the promotional and packaging materials for Blackstar, the final album of English musician David Bowie before his death in January 2016.

Unicode coverage 
DejaVu is a project which aims for complete coverage of the alphabetic scripts, abjads, and symbols with all characters that are part of the MES-1, MES-2, and hopefully MES-3 subsets of Unicode. The coverage is already considerable, although some more work is needed to include more hinting rules for clear results at small sizes. Some kerning rules are still being developed for the Sans and Serif styles, for fine typography. Some work is still also needed to create ligatures in these styles.

As of version 2.37, it included characters from the following Unicode blocks. (The fraction given is the number of characters in each block that are included in the DejaVu fonts.)

Styles 
The 10 styles provided by the original Bitstream Vera fonts have been augmented to 21 styles:

Original styles are marked in bold.

DejaVu Sans Mono 
The DejaVu Sans Mono typeface in particular is suitable for technical contexts, since it clearly distinguishes "l" (lowercase L) from "1" (one) and from "I" (uppercase i); also it clearly distinguishes "0" (zero, null) from "O" (uppercase o).

One derivative of the DejaVu Sans Mono typeface, the Menlo typeface, is provided by Apple with the Mac OS X 10.6 operating system.

See also 
 List of typefaces
 Unicode font
 Open-source Unicode typefaces

Notes

References

External links 
 
 
 Official website-wiki archive The Wayback Machine final crawl before site was shut down
 

Unified serif and sans-serif typeface families
Monospaced typefaces
Free software Unicode typefaces
Typefaces and fonts introduced in 2004